A career average pension or career average revalued earnings pension (CARE pension) is a type of occupational pension scheme, where people saving for retirement pay for a benefit after retirement where they will receive a sum that is calculated according to their average earnings over their career. Particularly in UK pensions, this model has been introduced as an alternative to both defined contribution pensions, which may run out and lead to old age poverty if they live longer, and final salary pensions which give people a benefit based on the last salary they earned before retirement. It is thought that career average pensions are fairer than final salary pensions, when people have not, for instance in their last few years of work, jumped up to management positions with much higher salaries: career average pensions mean that lower earners do not subsidise much higher pension benefits for just a few people.

UK public sector CARE pensions are revalued annually in accordance with rates issued by His Majesty's Treasury under the Public Service
Pensions Act 2013.

References

See also
UK labour law
English trusts law

Pensions in the United Kingdom
United Kingdom labour law